Zoltán Rónai (born as Zoltán Rosenthal; 16 August 1880 – 17 May 1940) was a Hungarian politician and jurist of Jewish descent, who served as People's Commissar of Justice in 1919 during the Hungarian Soviet Republic. Before the First World War he worked as a journalist of the Népszava and of the Szocializmus. He was a supporter of the centrist Zsigmond Kunfi. After the fall of the communist regime he emigrated to Vienna to joining to the Two and Half Internationale. Then he lived in Austria, France and finally Belgium. He published articles for the Szocializmus, using the pseudonym of Zoltán Vándor. After the Nazi invasion of Belgium he committed suicide.

References

 Magyar Életrajzi Lexikon

1880 births
1940 deaths
1940 suicides
Hungarian journalists
Justice ministers of Hungary
Jewish Hungarian politicians
Hungarian emigrants to Belgium
Hungarian politicians who committed suicide
Suicides in Belgium
20th-century journalists
Hungarian Jews who died in the Holocaust
Suicides by Jews during the Holocaust